Klyonovka is a rural locality (a selo) and the administrative center of Klenovskoye Rural Settlement, Zhirnovsky District, Volgograd Oblast, Russia. The population was 928 as of 2010. There are 16 streets.

Geography 
Klyonovka is located in steppe of Khopyorsko-Buzulukskaya Plain, on the right bank of the Shchelkan River, 36 km northwest of Zhirnovsk (the district's administrative centre) by road. Fyodorovka is the nearest rural locality.

References 

Rural localities in Zhirnovsky District